Podkraj pri Mežici is a dispersed settlement northwest of Mežica in the Carinthia region in northern Slovenia.

Name
The name of the settlement was changed from Podkraj to Podkraj pri Mežici in 1955.

References

External links
Podkraj pri Mežici on Geopedia

Populated places in the Municipality of Mežica